Mahin Oskouei (1929 – January 2006) was an Iranian theater director and instructor and Iran's pioneering female theater arts figure.

Born in Tehran, she was Iran's first female theater director and first woman to appear on stage. She studied in Russia alongside Jerzy Grotowski, and her career included all aspects of Iranian theater, including writing plays and translating major plays by such writers as Gorki and Chekhov.

References

See also 
Persian cinema

Iranian theatre directors
People from Tehran
1929 births
2006 deaths